Wilmington Township is one of fifteen townships in DeKalb County, Indiana. As of the 2010 census, its population was 4,128 and it contained 1,623 housing units.

History
Wilmington Township was organized in 1837.

Geography

Cities and towns
 Butler

Unincorporated towns
 Moore

Adjacent townships
 Franklin Township (north)
 Troy Township (northeast)
 Stafford Township (east)
 Newville Township (southeast)
 Concord Township (south)
 Jackson Township (southwest)
 Grant Township (west)
 Union Township (west)
 Smithfield Township (northwest)

Major highways
  U.S. Route 6
  Indiana State Road 1
  Indiana State Road 8

Cemeteries
The township contains two cemeteries: Kraft and Krontz.

References
 United States Census Bureau cartographic boundary files
 U.S. Board on Geographic Names

External links

 Indiana Township Association
 United Township Association of Indiana

Townships in DeKalb County, Indiana
Townships in Indiana
1837 establishments in Indiana
Populated places established in 1837